Micromonospora echinospora is a species of bacteria that is known for producing the enediyne antibiotic calicheamicins.

References

External links
Type strain of Micromonospora echinospora at BacDive -  the Bacterial Diversity Metadatabase

Micromonosporaceae
Bacteria described in 1923